Odd André Elveland (born 16 July 1965) is a Norwegian jazz musician (saxophone), composer, arranger and jazz teacher.

Career
Elveland is educated on the jazz program at Norwegian University of Science and Technology (Trondheim Musikkonservatorium). As a performer he has toured in Norway with his own quartet with Håvard Wiik, Mats Eilertsen and Jarle Vespestad. He also has appeared with a trio with Ingebrigt Håker Flaten and Thomas Strønen.

He has recorded with Ditlef Eckhoff/Einar Iversen, The Sinatra Songbook (including solo performance with the Norwegian Radio Orchestra), The Swing Pack (Urban Breeze), Per Husby/Anne Lande and others.

Projects
As a jazz teacher Elveland has developed a unique concept of teaching even small children advanced jazz and improvised music. With the nationwide center Improbasen, he has engaged in comprehensive educational projects in Norway, Sweden, Denmark, Switzerland, Austria and Japan.

He is in charge of the jazz club Barnas Jazzhus, which specializes in developing concepts where children can perform jazz. Barnas Jazzhus was awarded jazz club of the year in Norway in 2013. With the international festival Kids in Jazz, Odd André Elveland has brought young talents from Norway, Sweden, Denmark, Switzerland, Spain, Austria, Ukraine and Japan together, to play concerts and develop musical friendships. In 2014 he received the award Ella-prisen for his work with children and jazz.

External links
Odd André Elveland

References

Håvard Wiik with Odd André Elveland Quartet – Ballade.noElveland/Flaten/Strønen to Kongsberg Jazz Festival- Ba.no The Sinatra Songbook – Ballade.noReview: Urban Breeze – Aftenposten.no (Stein Kagge, 2003)At the Varanger festival with Per Husby – Ballade.noImprobasen in concert – Oblad.no (Una Oksavik Oltedal, 2010) Improbasen, Cultural Exchange project – StavangerJazzforum.no Jazzcamp for girls – JazzDanmark.dk Barnas Jazzhus, Cultural Exchange with Swiss kids – Swingkids.ch Barnas Jazzhus, Cultural Exchange, interview with Swiss trumpet kid – Tagblatt.chBarnas Jazzhus awarded Jazz Club Of The Year in Norway – Jazzinorge.no (Camilla Slaattun Brauer, 2013)The award Ella-prisen 2014 – Jazzinorge.no

1965 births
Living people
Norwegian University of Science and Technology alumni
Musicians from Oslo
Norwegian jazz saxophonists
Norwegian jazz composers
Norwegian educators
21st-century saxophonists